Moriches Inlet is an inlet connecting Moriches Bay and the Atlantic Ocean. The name Moriches comes from Meritces, a Native American who owned land on Moriches Neck.

It forms the eastern border of Fire Island, New York and the western border of the barrier island on which West Hampton Dunes, New York is the closest community.

The inlet was present on Fire Island until it closed up during the 1800s. The inlet which split West Hampton from Fire Island was reformed by a Nor'easter in 1931. The 1931 storm created a geographic quirk for the western tip of the West Hampton island which is in the town of Brookhaven but in order to access it via land from Brookhaven a person must go through several miles of Southampton (town), New York.

The widening subsided in 1938 when the Great Hurricane of 1938 opened up the Shinnecock Inlet further east between Shinnecock Bay and the ocean.

In an attempt to stabilize the deterioration of the barrier island, local authorities built groines on the inlet in 1952–1953.  Local authorities have consistently urged that the inlet be kept open to allow boats from the mainland of Long Island to have access to the ocean.  The United States Army Corps of Engineers took over the maintenance of the inlets and jetties in the 1980s.

The Corps in turn ran into controversy with claims that the groynes and jetties were blocking the natural east to west longshore drift that replenished sand.

References

Brookhaven, New York
Fire Island, New York
Inlets of New York (state)
Landforms of Suffolk County, New York